Egas Garcia da Fonseca, known as "Bufo", (12th-century) was a Portuguese nobleman, 2nd Lord of Couto de Leomil (pt).

Biography 

Egas was the son of Garcia Rodrigues da Fonseca and  Dórida Gonçalves Viegas. His wife was Maior Pais de Curveira daughter of Paio Pires Romeu and Goda Soares.

References 

12th-century Portuguese people
Medieval Portuguese nobility